Alfred Thielemann (25 March 1869 – 20 December 1954) was a Norwegian sport shooter. He was born in Drammen, and his club was Riflen. He competed in military rifle at the 1912 Summer Olympics in Stockholm.

References

1869 births
1954 deaths
Sportspeople from Drammen
Shooters at the 1912 Summer Olympics
Olympic shooters of Norway
Norwegian male sport shooters